Sylvia Teresse Ceyer is a professor of chemistry at MIT, holding the John C. Sheehan Chair in Chemistry.  Until 2006, she held the chemistry chair of the National Academy of Sciences.

Early life and education
Ceyer graduated from Hope College in Holland, Michigan in 1974 with an A.B. in chemistry.  In 1979, she was awarded a Ph.D. in chemistry from the University of California, Berkeley. Her advisors were Y. T. Lee and Gabor Somorjai.  She was a postdoctoral fellow at the National Bureau of Standards (now the National Institute of Standards and Technology) from 1979 to 1981.

Career

MIT professor
Ceyer joined the MIT faculty in 1981.  In 1987, she became tenured.

In 2004, MIT was conducting a search for a new president, and she was appointed to the Faculty Advisory Committee to the MIT Corporation.  The Corporation chose Susan Hockfield, a neurobiologist from Yale University to be MIT's next president.

The following year, she was appointed associate head of MIT's Chemistry Department.

On July 1, 2010, she became head of the Chemistry Department, saying "It is my goal to further the Department of Chemistry's commitment to outstanding chemical research and education as set by a long line of distinguished department heads and faculty."

Research
Ceyer is a physical chemist whose main research interests lie in the interactions of molecules with surfaces.  This work is done in an ultra-high vacuum environment, because ambient gasses or liquids would otherwise modify the surface under study.  This allows unambiguous identification of the reactive species and processes of interest.  These surfaces can be templates for nanomechanical devices or catalysts for chemical reactions.  The central theme to her work is understanding of the so-called "pressure-gap", the disparity observed between reactions that occur under high pressure and the corresponding lack of reaction observed under ultra-high vacuum conditions.

Her contributions to surface science include discovery of collision induced processes at surfaces, in which an energetic, neutral, noble gas atom impinges on a surface pre-covered with an adsorbate, causing a reaction to occur between the surface and the adsorbate.  The reactions observed include dissociation, desorption, and absorption into the bulk of the substrate.  In addition, she discovered that electron energy loss spectroscopy can be used to detect species absorbed in the bulk of a substrate, and can be used to differentiate between bulk and surface species.  This paved the way for her discovery that hydrogen atoms absorbed in the bulk of a nickel sample are the key reactant in the hydrogenation of unsaturated hydrocarbons.  Another major discovery involved the reaction of fluorine molecules with a silicon surface (a reaction that is key to semiconductor device etching), in which the silicon surface abstracts a fluorine atom from the incident fluorine molecule, and the remaining fluorine atom scatters into the gas phase.  This is the reverse of the Eley-Rideal mechanism, one of the fundamental mechanism of gas-surface chemical reactions.

Honors and awards
Prior to holding the John C. Sheehan Chair in Chemistry, Ceyer held the Class of 1943 Career Development Chair from 1985 to 1988 and the W. M. Keck Foundation Professorship in Energy from 1991 to 1996.

In 1988, she was awarded the Harold E. Edgerton Award, the Baker Memorial Award for Excellence in Undergraduate teaching and the Young Scholar Award from the American Association of University Women. In 1993, Ceyer was given the Nobel Laureate Signature Award from the American Chemical Society and the School of Science Teaching Prize. She was a MacVicar Faculty Fellow in 1998.

Ceyer is a fellow of the National Academy of Sciences, the American Physical Society and the American Academy of Arts and Sciences.  She has held the Langmuir Lectureship of the American Chemical Society and the Welch Foundation Lectureship.

She was presented with the Willard Gibbs Award on May 26, 2007, for her research on heterogeneous catalysis.

Selected publications

References

External links
 Sylvia Ceyer's homepage at MIT
 MIT Chemistry Department homepage
 5.112 Principles of Chemical Science video lectures by Profs. Sylvia Ceyer and Christopher Cummins
Phoenix S&T, Inc.: Dr. S.T. Ceyer (M.I.T.) and Dr. G.W. Parshall (Science Director of DuPont, retired) to join Science Board of Advisors

Massachusetts Institute of Technology School of Science faculty
American physical chemists
Living people
Year of birth missing (living people)
UC Berkeley College of Chemistry alumni
Hope College alumni
Members of the United States National Academy of Sciences
Fellows of the American Physical Society